Lar or LAR may refer to:

Places

India
 Lar, Uttar Pradesh, a town in Deoria District
 Lar (Jammu and Kashmir), a town
 Lata (region), also known as Lar, former region of southern Gujarat

Iran
 Lar, Iran, a city in Fars Province
 Lar, East Azerbaijan, a village
 Lar, or Sar, East Azerbaijan, a village
 Lar, Kohgiluyeh and Boyer-Ahmad, a village
 Lar, Markazi, a village
 Lar, Zanjan, a village 
 Lar Rural District, a subdivision of Chaharmahal and Bakhtiari Province

Transport
 LAR Romanian Airlines
 Laramie Regional Airport, Wyoming, US, IATA code
 Latimer Road tube station, London, London Underground station code

Other uses
 Lares, ancient Roman gods
 Lar gibbon (Hylobates lar)
 Light Armored Reconnaissance battalions of the US Marine corps
 Long-acting-release, a type of modified-release dosage form for medications
 Los Angeles Rams, a U.S. football team 
 Los Angeles Review

 Lower anterior resection